Great Britain competed at the 2012 Summer Paralympics in London, United Kingdom, from 29 August to 9 September 2012 as the host nation. A total of 288 athletes were selected to compete along with 13 other team members such as sighted guides. The country finished third in the medals table, behind China and Russia, winning 120 medals in total; 34 gold, 43 silver and 43 bronze. Multiple medallists included cyclist Sarah Storey and wheelchair athlete David Weir, who won four gold medals each, and swimmer Stephanie Millward who won a total of five medals. Storey also became the British athlete with the most overall medals, 22, and equal-most gold medals, 11, in Paralympic Games history.

To commemorate the achievements of each gold medallist at the 2012 Paralympics and Olympics, Royal Mail painted a post box gold, usually in the athlete's home town.

Team name

Despite the team being made up of athletes from the whole United Kingdom they compete under the name of Great Britain, a name first assigned by the International Olympic Committee (IOC) for the 1908 Summer Olympics along with the IOC country code GBR, and later used by the International Paralympic Committee for the Paralympic Games. The team is also referred to as "ParalympicsGB". Representatives of the devolved Northern Ireland government have objected to the name, which they argue creates a perception that Northern Ireland is not part of the British team, and have called for the team to be renamed as Team UK.

Medallists

Each gold medallist had a post box painted gold by Royal Mail in recognition of their achievement, usually located in their home-town. A first class stamp depicting each gold medal-winning individual or team was also produced.

The following British competitors won medals at the Games. In the 'by discipline' sections below, medallists' names are in bold.

Multiple medallists

The following Team GB competitors won multiple medals at the 2012 Paralympic Games.

UK Sport, the body responsible for the distribution of National Lottery funding to elite sport, set the British team a target of winning 103 medals across at least 12 different sports. The target was one medal more than the team had won at the 2008 Summer Paralympics in Beijing. Additionally UK Sport wanted the team to maintain its second-place finish in the medal table from Beijing.

Archery

On 9 September 2011, Great Britain secured seven places at the Stoke Mandeville International, in addition to the six that they already had. Twenty British archers took part in a two-stage selection process to determine the final squad of thirteen.

In the women's individual compound open category, Danielle Brown defeated Mel Clarke with the final arrow of the match in an all-British final to retain the title she won in 2008. No other British archers advanced past the quarter-finals in the individual events, despite Kenny Allen setting a new Paralympic record in the ranking rounds of the men's individual recurve standing event. The men's team finished in fourth place after reaching the bronze medal final where they lost to China.

Men

|-
|align=left|John Cavanagh
|align=left|Ind. compound W1
|616
|7
|
| (10)W 7–1
| (2)L 1–7
|colspan=3|did not advance
|-
|align=left|Richard Hennahane
|align=left rowspan="2"|Ind. compound open
|640
|16
| (17)L 4–6
|colspan=5|did not advance
|-
|align=left|John Stubbs
|669
|4
|
| (13)L 4–6
|colspan=4|did not advance
|-
|align=left|Paul Browne
|align=left|Ind. recurve W1/W2
|598
|9
| (24)W 6–0
| (8)W 6–4
| (1)L 4–6
|colspan=3|did not advance
|-
|align=left|Kenny Allen
|align=left rowspan="3"|Ind. recurve standing
|651 PR
|1
|
| (17)L 4–6
|colspan=4|did not advance
|-
|align=left|Phil Bottomley
|630
|3
|
| (19)L 4–6
|colspan=4|did not advance
|-
|align=left|Murray Elliot
|542
|24
| (9)L 0–6
|colspan=5|did not advance
|-
|align=left|Kenny AllenPhil BottomleyPaul Browne
|align=left|Team recurve open
|1879
|1
|
|
| (8)W 195–179
| (5)L 190–197
| (3)L 193–206
|4
|}

Women

|-
|align=left|Pippa Britton
|align=left rowspan=3|Ind. compound open
|641
|8
|
| (9)L 4–6
|colspan=4|did not advance
|-
|align=left|Danielle Brown
|676
|1
|
|
| (9)W 6–4
| (4)W 6–2
| (3)W 6–4
|
|-
|align=left|Mel Clarke
|648
|3
|
|
| (11)W 6–4
| (2)W 6–0
| (1)L 4–6
|
|-
|align=left|Kate Murray
|align=left|Ind. recurve W1/W2
|533
|8
|
| (9)L 1–7
|colspan=4|did not advance
|-
|align=left|Sharon Vennard
|align=left rowspan=2|Ind. recurve standing
|549
|6
|
| (11)W 6–2
| (3)L 0–6
|colspan=3|did not advance
|-
|align=left|Leigh Walmsley
|467
|18
| (15)W 6–0
| (2)L 1–7
|colspan=4|did not advance
|-
|align=left|Kate MurraySharon VennardLeigh Walmsley
|align=left|Team recurve open
|1549
|6
|colspan=2 
| (3)L 153–188
|colspan=3|did not advance
|}

Athletics

On 10 July 2012 the British Paralympic Association named a 49-member squad to compete for Great Britain in athletics, although Andy Kaar was later forced to withdraw due to injury. Included in the squad were David Weir, who won Britain's only athletics gold medals at the 2008 Summer Paralympics and Tracey Hinton, who competed at her sixth Paralympics.

Key

Men–track

Men–field

Women–track

Women–field

Boccia

Nine British boccia players were selected to compete in London, five of whom made their Paralympic debuts. In the individual events, David Smith won silver in the BC1 event after losing to Pattaya Tadtong of Thailand in the final. The 2008 gold medal-winning BC1-2 team lost to Thailand in the semi-finals and went on to defeat Portugal in the bronze medal final.

Individual

Pairs and teams

Cycling

Great Britain named a 19-member cycling squad for the Games, made up of 15 riders and 4 pilots. The team included seven riders who won gold medals at the 2008 Games.

British cyclists won a total of 22 medals, eight of which were gold, to finish top of the cycling medal table. This was two more medals than the team won in Beijing, although fewer gold medals were won. Sarah Storey won four gold medals in track and road events to become the most successful British Paralympian with 22 career medals, and equal the 11 total golds of Tanni Grey-Thompson and David Roberts.

Jody Cundy won a bronze medal in the men's C4 individual pursuit, but was controversially not allowed a restart after a problem with his start in the men's C4-5 time trial. Former RAF technician Jon-Allan Butterworth, competing in his first Paralympics, won the silver medal in that event along with two other silver medals in the men's C5 individual pursuit and as part of the C1-5 sprint team. In the men's B time trial, the tandem of Anthony Kappes and pilot Craig MacLean twice had a mechanical problem with their chain and were not allowed a second restart. Neil Fachie and pilot Barney Storey won the gold medal in a world record time. Both pairings met in an all-British final in the men's B sprint event, where Kappes and MacLean won the gold medal after breaking the world record time during the qualification round. Mark Colbourne set two new world records on the way to gold in the men's C1 individual pursuit, while David Stone won gold in the T1-2 road race, defending the title he won in 2008.

In the women's H1-3 road race, Karen Darke and Rachel Morris finished together in the same time holding hands. Although the two wanted to share the bronze, Morris was awarded the medal having crossed the line slightly ahead.

Road

Track
Pursuit

Key: OVL – Win by overtaking

Sprint

Time trial

Key: FT – Factor time; AT – Actual time

Equestrian

The only equestrian events held in the Paralympic Games are in the Dressage discipline. Great Britain sent a team of five riders to the Games. Nine-time gold medal winner Lee Pearson took part in his fourth Paralympic Games. Also selected were Deborah Criddle, Sophie Christiansen, Sophie Wells and Natasha Baker. British riders won medals in every event winning five gold medals, five silver and one bronze. Sophie Christiansen won three gold medals, with two individual golds in the grade Ia championship and freestyle events in addition to the team gold. Natasha Baker won both the individual grade II events in her first appearance at the Paralympics. Lee Pearson, previously unbeaten in Paralympic competition, won silver and bronze in the grade Ib individual events as well as his tenth gold in the team event.

Individual

Team

* Indicates the three best individual scores that count towards the team total.

Football 5-a-side

5-a-side football is for vision-impaired athletes. All competitors wear eyeshades to account for varying levels of sight, except for the goalkeeper who may be sighted. The squad was announced on 16 April 2012. The team lost their final group match to Iran, having missed four penalties in a match that they needed to win by two goals in order to advance to the semi-finals. Captain David Clarke scored in his final international match as Britain defeated Turkey 2–0 to win the classification playoff for seventh place.

Group play

Semi-final 5–8

Classification 7–8

Football 7-a-side

7-a-side football is for cerebral palsy sufferers. Athletes who classify as C5-C8 can take part in this sport, with C5 being most disabled. At least one C5 or C6 player, and no more than three C8 players, may be on the field at a given time. The squad was announced on 16 April 2012 and included Martin Sinclair, the brother of 2012 Olympian Scott Sinclair; the pair became the first siblings to represent Great Britain at a Paralympic and Olympic Games in the same year. Britain were eliminated at the group stage after defeats to Brazil and defending champions Ukraine. The team went on to defeat the US after scoring two goals in extra time in the classification playoff for seventh place.

Group play

Semi-final 5–8

Classification 7–8

Goalball

As hosts, Great Britain were entitled to enter a team in the men's and women's goalball tournaments, and competed for the first time since the 2000 Games. The women's team advanced from the group stage with victories over Brazil and Denmark. They were defeated by Sweden in their quarter-final after conceding a goal in overtime. The men's team finished sixth in their group, taking their first point in Paralympic competition with a draw against Sweden.

Men's tournament

Group play

Women's tournament

Group play

Quarter-final

Judo

Five British judokas qualified for the Games. Two sets of brothers were selected: Dan and Marc Powell, as well as Joe and Sam Ingram. Sam Ingram and Ben Quilter competed at the 2008 Games, with Ingram winning a bronze medal. All events were for visually impaired athletes. Sam Ingram won a silver medal in the –90 kg category, narrowly losing the gold medal contest to Jorge Hierrezuelo Marcillis of Cuba by a yuko. No other British judoka reached the semifinals, but Ben Quilter advanced through the repechage contest to win a bronze medal in the –60 kg category after defeating Japan's Takaaki Hirai by ippon.

Powerlifting

Six powerlifters were named in the GB team, although Paul Efayena was barred from participating due to a previous criminal conviction. Natalie Blake, Jason Irving, Ali Jawad and Anthony Peddle had all competed at previous Games, with Peddle making his seventh appearance in 2012. Zoe Newson won a bronze medal in the women's –40 kg category, Britain's only medal of the Games, by successfully lifting 88 kg with her final attempt. Ali Jawad narrowly missed out on a medal in the men's –56 kg category with two attempts at 189 kg judged to be unsuccessful. He finished fourth having weighed in heavier than third placed Jian Wang of China, after both competitors finished on 185 kg.

Rowing

The mixed adaptive double crew of Captain Nick Beighton and Sam Scowen qualified for London 2012 at the World Rowing Championships. 2008 gold medallist Tom Aggar qualified in the men's single sculls. The mixed coxed four of Naomi Riches, Pam Relph, David Smith, James Roe and cox Lily van den Broecke, who won gold at the 2011 World Rowing Championships, were also selected. Britain's only medal of the regatta was a gold won by the mixed coxed four crew. Nick Beighton and Sam Scowen came fourth in the mixed double sculls, missing out on bronze in a photo finish. Tom Aggar finished in fourth place in the final of the men's single sculls, his first defeat in five years of international racing.

Qualification Legend: FA=Final A (medal); FB=Final B (non-medal); R=Repechage

Sailing

Great Britain entered the same three crews that had competed in 2008. On 8 August 2011, five sailors became the first people to be named on the 2012 Paralympic team. John Robertson, Hannah Stodel and Stephen Thomas were selected in the three-person Sonar competition. Also announced in the team were current SKUD 18 World Champions, Niki Birrell and Alex Rickham. Helena Lucas was subsequently selected in the 2.4 mR class.

Great Britain won their first ever medals in the sport since its introduction at the 2000 Paralympic Games. The final day of racing was cancelled due to lack of wind, with Helena Lucas in gold medal position in the 2.4 mR class and the SKUD 18 crew in bronze medal position after ten races. The three-person Sonar crew were given a four-point penalty for breaking the boat maintenance rules, moving them from third to fifth position overall.

Note: (#) denotes the highest points finish which does not count towards the final net points total.

Shooting

A squad of twelve competitors were selected to take part in the shooting events including 2008 gold medal winner Matt Skelhon and Di Coates, who first competed at the 1984 Games, making her eighth Paralympic appearance. Matt Skelhon won silver in the 10 m air rifle prone SH1 event that he won in 2008. James Bevis won a bronze medal in the 10 m air rifle prone SH2 event, losing a shootoff to Raphaël Voltz of France 10.4–10.5 after both scored a total of 705.9. Matt Skelhon went on to win bronze in the 50 m rifle prone SH1 event, which he first took part in eighteen months previously.

Sitting volleyball

The British Paralympic Association announced that the men's and women's teams would take up their home quota places in September 2011 and March 2012 respectively. The women's team, including 7 July 2005 London bombings survivor Martine Wright, finished eighth without winning a set. The men's team also finished eighth, having advanced to the quarter-final stage after defeating Morocco.

Men's tournament
Roster

Group play

Quarter-final

5th–8th place semi-final

7th–8th place match

Women's tournament
Roster

Group play

Semi-final 5–8

Classification 7–8

Swimming

British Swimming selected 44 swimmers for the Paralympic Games based on qualifying times set at trial events in London and Sheffield in March and April 2012 respectively. Selection of the first sixteen competitors was confirmed by the British Paralympic Association in April 2012, with a further 28 selected in May on confirmation of available slots by IPC Swimming.

British swimmers won seven gold, sixteen silver and sixteen bronze medals in total. In the women's S6 events, Eleanor Simmonds set new world record times in the 400 m freestyle and 200 m individual medley SM6 to win two gold medals, in addition to silver in the 100 m freestyle and bronze in the 50 m freestyle events. S7 swimmers Josef Craig and Jonathan Fox both posted new world record times on the way to gold in the 400 m freestyle and 100 m backstroke respectively. Jessica-Jane Applegate won the women's 200 m freestyle S14 setting a new Paralympic record in the final. Gold medals were also won by S8 swimmers Heather Frederiksen in the women's 100 m backstroke and Oliver Hynd, who set a new European record in the men's 200 m individual medley SM8. Stephanie Millward won five medals, the most of any ParalympicsGB competitor, in both individual and relay events.

Men

Qualifiers for the latter rounds (Q) of all events were decided on a time only basis, therefore positions shown are overall results versus competitors in all heats.

Women

Qualifiers for the latter rounds (Q) of all events were decided on a time only basis, therefore positions shown are overall results versus competitors in all heats.

Table tennis

Thirteen athletes competed for GB in table tennis. Athletes in classes 1 to 5 compete in wheelchairs, while classes 6 to 10 compete standing. Lower numbered classes indicate a higher severity disability. Athletes with intellectual disabilities compete in class 11.

Will Bayley won a silver medal in the class 7 men's singles, losing to Jochen Wollmert of Germany in the final. Paul Davies, competing in his first Paralympics, won a bronze medal in the class 1 men's singles. In the team events, both the men's class 6-8 team and the women's class 1-3 team won bronze medals with victories over Germany and Italy respectively.

Men

Women

Wheelchair basketball

As hosts Great Britain automatically qualified one men's team and one women's team in wheelchair basketball. Competing athletes are given an eight-level-score specific to wheelchair basketball, ranging from 0.5 to 4.5 with lower scores representing a higher degree of disability. The sum score of all players on the court cannot exceed 14.

The men's team were defeated by Canada in the semi-final and went on to finish fourth after losing the bronze medal final to the US. The women's team were knocked out of the competition at the quarter-final stage by Germany. They finished seventh after winning their classification final against Mexico.

Men's tournament

Group play

Quarter-final

Semi-final

Bronze medal match

Women's tournament

Group play

Quarter-final

5th–8th place semi-final

7th/8th place match

Wheelchair fencing

Great Britain named a squad of seven fencers competing across five events. The squad included 14-year-old Gabi Down as well as 1992 bronze medallist David Heaton who returned to the sport having retired after the 2004 Paralympics.

Tom Hall-Butcher advanced from the opening qualification pools but lost to Cheong Meng Chai of Hong Kong in the last 16 round. Justine Moore was eliminated in the qualification rounds in both the women's individual foil and épée events. Both men's and women's teams finished eighth without winning a match.

Note: Ranks from qualification pools were given as an overall ranking against all other competitors.

Wheelchair rugby

Great Britain qualified to compete in wheelchair rugby as host nation. A squad of 11 was named with five athletes returning from the 2008 Games, where the team finished fourth. The team did not advance to the semi-finals after defeats to the United States and Japan in the group stage. Britain went on to win their classification matches against Belgium and Sweden to finish in fifth place in the competition.

Group play

Semi-final 5–8

Classification 5–6

Wheelchair tennis

Of the ten athletes selected to compete in wheelchair tennis, seven had competed in 2008, including double Paralympic quad singles champion Peter Norfolk. In the singles events, no British competitor advanced past the quarter-final stage. Defending quad singles champion Peter Norfolk was defeated in the quarter-finals by Shraga Weinberg of Israel in three sets, while ninth seed Gordon Reid and eighth seed Lucy Shuker reached the quarter-finals in the men's singles and women's singles respectively.

Peter Norfolk and Andy Lapthorne won a silver medal in the quad doubles, losing the final against defending champions Nicholas Taylor and David Wagner of the US in three sets. Lucy Shuker and Jordanne Whiley won a bronze medal in the women's doubles having lost the first set and saved a match point in the bronze medal final against Thailand's Sakhorn Khanthasit and Ratana Techamaneewat.

Victory parade

A celebratory parade took place on 10 September 2012 commemorating the Olympic and Paralympic Games.

See also
2012 Summer Paralympics
Great Britain at the Paralympics
Great Britain at the 2012 Summer Olympics

Notes

Nations at the 2012 Summer Paralympics
2012
Paralympics